Helen Cawley and JoAnne Russell were the defending champions, but lost in the quarterfinals to Françoise Dürr and Virginia Wade.

Kerry Reid and Wendy Turnbull defeated Mima Jaušovec and Virginia Ruzici in the final, 4–6, 9–8(12–10), 6–3 to win the ladies' doubles tennis title at the 1978 Wimbledon Championships.

Seeds

  Billie Jean King /  Martina Navratilova (quarterfinals)
  Evonne Cawley /  Betty Stöve (third round, withdrew)
  Françoise Dürr /  Virginia Wade (semifinals)
  Kerry Reid /  Wendy Turnbull (champions)
  Helen Cawley /  JoAnne Russell (quarterfinals)
  Sue Barker /  Mona Guerrant (semifinals)
  Mima Jaušovec /  Virginia Ruzici (final)
  Ilana Kloss /  Marise Kruger (quarterfinals)

Draw

Finals

Top half

Section 1

Section 2

Bottom half

Section 3

Section 4

References

External links

1978 Wimbledon Championships – Women's draws and results at the International Tennis Federation

Women's Doubles
Wimbledon Championship by year – Women's doubles
Wimbledon Championships
Wimbledon Championships